Menzel Bourguiba, formerly known as Ferryville, is a town located in the extreme north of Tunisia, about  from Tunis, in the Bizerte Governorate.

Toponymy

The town's name translates as "House of Bourguiba", as it was named after the first president of independent Tunisia, Habib Bourguiba, in 1956. During the French protectorate of Tunisia (1881–1956), Menzel Bourguiba was named Ferryville, referring to contemporary French minister Jules Ferry and was nicknamed "Petit Paris" (Translated "Little Paris") by its inhabitants of French origin. In addition, it housed the arsenal of the French navy known as the Sidi-Abdallah, which was only handed over to the Tunisian authorities in 1962.

Geography

The town of Menzel Bourguiba is located about sixty kilometres north of Tunis and about twenty kilometres south of Bizerte, capital of the governorate of the same name. It is located in the south-west of the lake of Bizerte, on the narrow strip of land which passes between the lakes of Bizerte and Ichkeul.

An expressway connects the city to the RN8 and the A4 motorway linking Bizerte to Tunis. From Bizerte, the city is accessible from the RN11 which places it halfway between Bizerte and Mateur. In addition, the city is connected to the SNCFT railway network.

Its suburbs consist mainly of the outlying town of Tinja to the west and the Ennejah district a little further south. The Guengla beach, near which several colonial-style houses are still standing, is very popular with the city's residents. The hills of Sidi Yahya and Sidi Abdallah dominate the city.

History

In 1897, the French government took the decision to build an arsenal on a strategic site between lakes Ichkeul and Bizerte. As the North African Real Estate Company owned a large part of the land nearby, it began to draw up plans for the town to which the company's largest shareholder, Joseph Décoret, wished to give his name.

His untimely death, even before the town was erected as a municipality, allowed the general resident to impose the name Ferryville in honour of the French minister Jules Ferry, the inspirer of the French protectorate of Tunisia.

During the Second World War, the city was relatively spared, unlike the nearby town of Bizerte, 77% of whose European quarter was destroyed by American bombing in late 1942-early 1943. However, from August 1944 to March 1945, the city suffered a plague epidemic from Morocco and then Algeria, which was contained by the French naval medical services. The official toll of the epidemic was 37 hospitalized patients, ten of whom died. The cases were distributed among the population as follows: 25 Europeans and 12 Tunisians of Tunisian origin. The victims occupy a wide variety of positions in society: 18 are foreigners in the navy (eight deaths) and eight work in the arsenal (two deaths), including two naval executives.

In 1952, the city was the scene of clashes marking the uprising of Tunisia for its accession to independence. Thus, on 17 January, one day before the arrest of Habib Bourguiba and the holding of the clandestine Neo-Destour congress proclaiming armed struggle, demonstrations broke out and were harshly repressed: the toll was three dead and around fifty wounded6. A local odonym, "Avenue du 17-Janvier 1952", recalls this event.

The name of the town, which means "house of Bourguiba" in Arabic, was given to it in 1956 by Bourguiba himself, who had just gained independence from Tunisia and the following year became the first President of the Republic. By giving this name to Ferryville, he thus underlines the return of the country's sovereignty.

However, the Sidi-Abdallah arsenal was not evacuated by the French navy until 1 July 1962. Nowadays, the arsenal has become a shipyard for the repair and maintenance of merchant ships. It also contains small manufacturing industries.

Economy

Menzel Bourguiba is an important town for economic reasons. Its economy is based mainly around metallurgy. It was founded as a naval installation under French rule, because of its strategic location between two lakes: The inland Ichkeul Lake on the west, and Bizerte Lake on the east, which connects to the Mediterranean Sea by the Bizerte canal.

Its most important economic activity was the ailing state-owned shipyard. The yard has seen its workforce decline, after the high level of activity in the 1970s and 1980s, when Tunisia had a larger merchant fleet and when the Soviet Union used Menzel Bourguiba to drydock its ships. At that time, the yard employed over 1,300 people. It was bought by the French ship repair company, Compagnie Marseille Réparation in 2004 and has been renamed to CMR Tunisia Ship Repairs.

Climate

Twin cities

Menzel Bourguiba is twinned with:

Menzel Bourguiba Mayors

Celebrities From Menzel Bourguiba

 Majdouline Cherni : Politician
 Mohamed Habib Marzouki : Politician
 Ridha Saidi : Politician
 Aymen Ben Ahmed : Sportsman
  Driss ben Mohamed Laabidi  : Retraité de la Garde Nationale
 Paul Barge : French Actor
 Élisabeth Faure : French Painter
 Michel Giliberti :French Painter & Photographer
 Nicole Gotteri : French Historian & Activist 
 Jean-Gabriel Montador : French Painter

Gallery

Notes

References

External links 
Menzel Bourguiba page at the Global Gazetteer (including location map)
Ferryville. Menzel Bourguiba (site dedicated to pre-1961 period, in French)
Old postcards from Menzel Bourguiba
Bizerta Economic Activities Park

Populated places in Bizerte Governorate
Communes of Tunisia